Paraloma is an unincorporated community in Washington Township, Sevier County, Arkansas, United States. It is located on Highway 234 north of Millwood Lake.

References

Unincorporated communities in Sevier County, Arkansas
Unincorporated communities in Arkansas